A Train To Autumn (abbreviated as ATTA) was a four-member South Korean ballad group formed by Cube Entertainment in 2018. The group debuted on November 5, 2018 with single "That Season You Were In". On November 9, the group performed their song on KBS2's Music Bank.

History
On July 15, 2018, A Train To Autumn released a single titled "A Watercolor of a Rainy Day" which featured a male-female duet. Cube entertainment did not reveal the identities of the singers. On November 2, Cube announced they will officially debut them on November 5 with first single "That Season You Were In" written by Kino of Pentagon. It is the first singles of their five-part "farewell" series.

In 2019, the group were officially introduced with the released of "Farewell Again"'s (다시 이별) showcase held at the Ilchi Art Hall on February 25. The song is composed and written by Rocoberry. On April 29, "Spring Rain" (우산을 쓰고) was release.

In 2020, The group's profile was removed from the Cube Entertainment website, confirming their disbandment.

Members
The members were mainly selected through blind vocal audition, except Soo-bin. The judges of the audition were led by Park Choong-min, the chairman of Cube Entertainment, professors of Howon University and more.

Hwang Ji-hyun was the leader of the group. She featured in Play Kim's digital single "How Nice Would It Be" (얼마나 좋을까) in July 2018.

Kim Soo-bin performed Kim Se-jeong's "Flower Road" during her third year of high school. In January 2017, Dingo published the "Flower Road" video, and she was invited to audition to join Cube.

Lee Ah-young

Baek So-mi

Discography

Singles

Soundtrack appearances

Concert

Showcase
 Farewell Again Comeback Showcase ( 25 February 2019)

Concert participation
 U & Cube Festival 2019 in Japan (2019)

References

External links
A Train To Autumn Official Instagram

2018 establishments in South Korea
Musical groups established in 2018
Cube Entertainment artists
K-pop music groups
2020 disestablishments in South Korea
Musical groups disestablished in 2020